Isaiah Whitehead (born March 8, 1995) is an American professional basketball player for Beşiktaş Emlakjet of the Basketbol Süper Ligi (BSL). He played college basketball for Seton Hall.

High school career
Whitehead rose to prominence playing for Abraham Lincoln High School, and was a highly touted recruit coming into college. Whitehead played at the 2014 McDonald's All-American Boys Game, the 2014 Jordan Brand Classic, and many other prestigious tournaments in high school. He was labeled a five-star recruit by Rivals.com and 247Sports.com, being named Mr. New York Basketball, the recipient of the 2014 PSAL Wingate Award, Co-Most Valuable Player in the 2013 Under Armour Elite 24 game, and the highest-rated New York City recruit since 2009.

College career
Whitehead was named preseason Big East Rookie of the Year and made the All-Rookie Team as a freshman. He was twice selected as Rookie of the Week on December 8 and December 15. He missed nine games during the season due to a stress fracture in his right foot.

At the conclusion of the 2015–16 regular season, Whitehead was unanimously selected to the All-Big East first team. He also received the Haggerty Award, given to the New York area's top men's Division I basketball player. Whitehead led Seton Hall to their first Big East Championship in 23 years. The Pirates took down Creighton, Xavier and Villanova in the final. Whitehead was awarded with the Tournament's Most Outstanding Player award. Next, the Hall earned their first NCAA berth in 10 years. Seton Hall was defeated by the Gonzaga Bulldogs in the first round in Denver.

In March 2016, Whitehead declared for the NBA draft, forgoing his final two years of college eligibility.

Professional career

Brooklyn Nets (2016–2018)
On June 23, 2016, Whitehead was selected by the Utah Jazz with the 42nd overall pick in the 2016 NBA draft. He was later traded to the Brooklyn Nets the following day. On July 8, 2016, he signed with the Nets and joined the team for the 2016 NBA Summer League. On January 6, 2017, Whitehead recorded his first career double-double with 10 points and 10 rebounds in 116–108 loss to the Cleveland Cavaliers. On March 10, 2017, he scored a career-high 24 points in a 105–96 loss to the Dallas Mavericks. On April 8, 2017, with one block against the Chicago Bulls, Whitehead tied an all-time team record by a guard in a single-season with 36, set by Darwin Cook during the 1980–81 season.

On November 27, 2017, Whitehead tied his career high with 24 points while shooting 10 of 16 from the field in a 117–103 loss to the Houston Rockets. During the 2017–18 season, he has been assigned multiple times to the Long Island Nets of the NBA G League. He was traded to the Denver Nuggets and later waived.

In 30 games of the 2017–18 NBA G League season, Whitehead averaged 22.3 PPG, 3.7 RPG and 3.6 APG in 28.7 minutes per game.

Lokomotiv Kuban (2018–2019)
Whitehead signed with the Russian team Lokomotiv Kuban on August 6, 2018. On January 7, 2019, Whitehead agreed to part ways with Lokomotiv.

Grand Rapids Drive (2019) 
On January 15, 2019, Whitehead signed with the Detroit Pistons on a two-way contract. He did not end up appearing in any games for the Pistons.

In four games of the 2018–19 NBA G League season, Whitehead has averaged 19.5 PPG, 4.5 RPG and 6.3 APG in 33.8 minutes per game.

On June 23, 2019, the Portland Trail Blazers signed Whitehead to their Summer League roster.

BC Astana (2019) 
On October 10, 2019, Whitehead signed with BC Astana of the Kazakhstan Championship. In five games, he averaged 9.6 points, 3.4 rebounds and 2.8 assists per game.

Mornar Bar (2020–2021)
On January 25, 2020, Whitehead signed with Mornar Bar of the ABA League and Montenegrin League. He played five games before the season was suspended, scoring 24 points in his only Champions League appearance. On April 29, he extended his contract with the team.

Beşiktaş (2021–2022)
On August 27, 2021, Whitehead signed with Beşiktaş Icrypex of the Basketball Super League.

Riesen Ludwigsburg (2022–2023)
On September 23, 2022, he has signed with Riesen Ludwigsburg of the Basketball Bundesliga. Whitehead and Ludwigsburg parted ways on January 15, 2023, the contract was mutually cancelled.

Beşiktaş (2023–present)
On January 17, 2023, he signed with Beşiktaş Emlakjet of the Basketbol Süper Ligi (BSL).

NBA career statistics

Regular season

|-
| style="text-align:left;"| 
| style="text-align:left;"| Brooklyn
| 73 || 26 || 22.5 || .402 || .295 || .805 || 2.5 || 2.6 || .6 || .5 || 7.4
|-
| style="text-align:left;"| 
| style="text-align:left;"| Brooklyn
| 16 || 0 || 11.3 || .465 || .389 || .684 || 1.6 || 1.3 || .5 || .1 || 6.3
|- class="sortbottom"
| style="text-align:center;" colspan="2"| Career
| 89 || 26 || 20.5 || .411 || .305 || .788 || 2.4 || 2.4 || .6 || .4 || 7.2

References

External links

Seton Hall Pirates bio

1995 births
Living people
21st-century African-American sportspeople
Abraham Lincoln High School (Brooklyn) alumni
African-American basketball players
American expatriate basketball people in Kazakhstan
American expatriate basketball people in Montenegro
American expatriate basketball people in Russia
American men's basketball players
Basketball players from New York City
BC Astana players
Beşiktaş men's basketball players
Brooklyn Nets players
Grand Rapids Drive players
KK Mornar Bar players
Long Island Nets players
McDonald's High School All-Americans
Parade High School All-Americans (boys' basketball)
PBC Lokomotiv-Kuban players
Riesen Ludwigsburg players
Seton Hall Pirates men's basketball players
Shooting guards
Sportspeople from Brooklyn
Utah Jazz draft picks